Philautus cinerascens is a species of frog in the family Rhacophoridae.
It is endemic to Burma.

References

Amphibians of Myanmar
cinerascens
Endemic fauna of Myanmar
Amphibians described in 1870
Taxonomy articles created by Polbot